is a passenger railway station in located in the town of Yuasa, Arida District, Wakayama Prefecture, Japan, operated by West Japan Railway Company (JR West).

Lines

Station layout
The station consists of one side platform and one island platform connected to the station building by a footbridge. The station is unattended.

Platforms

Adjacent stations

|-
!colspan=5|West Japan Railway Company (JR West)

History
It was renamed to its present name on March 1, 1965. With the privatization of the Japan National Railways (JNR) on April 1, 1987, the station came under the aegis of the West Japan Railway Company.

Passenger statistics
In fiscal 2019, the station was used by an average of 1006 passengers daily (boarding passengers only).

Surrounding Area
 Yuasa old town (National Important Preservation District for Traditional Buildings)
Yuasa Town Hall
Yuasa Castle Ruins
Yuasa Municipal Yuasa Elementary School

See also
List of railway stations in Japan

References

External links

 Yuasa Station Official Site

Railway stations in Wakayama Prefecture
Railway stations in Japan opened in 1927
Yuasa, Wakayama